Carolina Mendoza Hernández (born 25 April 1997 in Naucalpan, Mexico) is a Mexican diver. At only 15 years of age, she achieved qualification to participate at the 2012 Summer Olympics in the individual 10 metre platform event.

References
 dive meets

Mexican female divers
1997 births
Living people
Divers at the 2012 Summer Olympics
Divers at the 2020 Summer Olympics
Olympic divers of Mexico
People from Naucalpan
Sportspeople from the State of Mexico
Universiade medalists in diving
Universiade gold medalists for Mexico
Medalists at the 2019 Summer Universiade
20th-century Mexican women
21st-century Mexican women